The 2014–15 season of the División de Plata de Balonmano was the 21st season of second-tier handball in Spain.

Regular season began on 13 September 2014 and finished on 16 May 2015. After completing 30 matchdays, top team was promoted to Liga ASOBAL, while teams qualified 2nd, 3rd, 4th and 5th played the promotion playoff. The three bottom teams were relegated to Primera Estatal.

SD Teucro won regular season's first position, promoting to Liga ASOBAL for 2015–16 season. Go Fit won the promotion playoff and clinched the second promotion spot.

Competition rules 

The championship consist of 16 teams playing each other twice for a total of 30 matchdays. At end of regular season, the top team in the standings is promoted to Liga ASOBAL. Teams in 2nd, 3rd, 4th and 5th place play the promotion playoff for a single spot in Liga ASOBAL. Bottom  three teams are relegated to Primera División Estatal.

Points during regular season are awarded as following;

Each victory adds 2 points to the winner team.

Each drawn adds 1 point to each team.

Promotion and relegation 
Once finished 2014–15 regular season.

Teams promoted to Liga ASOBAL 2015–16
Teucro – regular season champions
Go Fit – promotion playoff winners

Teams relegated to 2014–15 Primera Nacional
Torrelavega
Automobica Barakaldo
Interstar Deporte Algemesí

Teams

Regular season standings

Promotion playoff

Winner of Promotion playoff final will play in Liga ASOBAL 2015–16 season.

Host team: Go Fit
City: Santander, Cantabria
Venue: Pabellón de La Albericia
Date: 30–31 May 2015

Bracket

Semifinals

Third place

Final

Top goal scorers

References

External links
Regular season standings
Full schedule

División de Plata de Balonmano seasons
2014–15 in Spanish handball